Nathan Clark Lashley (born December 12, 1982) is an American professional golfer who plays on the PGA Tour.

Early life
Lashley was born in Scottsbluff, Nebraska. He played college golf at the University of Arizona. During his junior year, his parents and girlfriend died in a plane crash in Wyoming while flying from Sunriver, Oregon, where they had watched Lashley compete in the NCAA West Regional, to Nebraska.

Professional career
Lashley turned professional after graduating in 2005. He played on the Nationwide Tour (now Korn Ferry Tour) in 2006 but made only two cuts in 14 events. He spent the next several years playing mini-tours and selling real estate before qualifying for the PGA Tour Latinoamérica in 2015. He finished 8th on the money list in 2015 with five top-10 finishes. In 2016, he won three events, led the money list and won the Player of the Year award. His placement on the money list earned him a Web.com Tour card for 2017.

On the Web.com Tour in 2017, Lashley won the Corales Puntacana Resort and Club Championship and finished 11th on the money list to earn his PGA Tour card for 2018. In 2018, he made eight cuts in 17 events before a knee injury ended his season. He started the 2019 PGA Tour on a minor medical extension, but did not fully meet the terms and spent that part of the season playing out of the 126-150 category.

In June 2019, Lashley earned his first PGA Tour win at the 2019 Rocket Mortgage Classic. Lashley failed to Monday qualify for the event, but gained entry as the third alternate and final man in the field. He was ranked 353rd in the world at the start of the week. He shot 63-67-63-70 to win by six strokes and earned $1,314,000 with the victory. In addition, his card PGA Tour card was now good until the end of the 2021–22 season and he was invited to play in the 2019 Open Championship, The Players Championship, Masters Tournament and the Sentry Tournament of Champions in 2020. The win moved him to 101st in the Official World Golf Ranking.

Professional wins (11)

PGA Tour wins (1)

Web.com Tour wins (1)

PGA Tour Latinoamérica wins (3)

Other wins (6)
2009 Utah Open
2010 Waterloo Open Golf Classic, Colorado Open, Wyoming Open
2011 Waterloo Open Golf Classic
2015 Utah Open

Results in major championships
Results not in chronological order in 2020.

CUT = missed the half-way cut
"T" indicates a tie for place
NT = No tournament due to COVID-19 pandemic

Results in The Players Championship

"T" indicates a tie for a place

Results in World Golf Championships

"T" = Tied

Team appearances
Aruba Cup (representing PGA Tour Latinoamérica): 2016 (winners)

See also
2017 Web.com Tour Finals graduates

References

External links
 
 

American male golfers
Arizona Wildcats men's golfers
PGA Tour Latinoamérica golfers
PGA Tour golfers
Korn Ferry Tour graduates
Golfers from Nebraska
Golfers from Scottsdale, Arizona
People from Scottsbluff, Nebraska
1982 births
Living people